Incerticyclus is a genus of tropical land snails with gills and an operculum, terrestrial gastropod mollusks. They are a part of the informal group Architaenioglossa, belonging to the clade Caenogastropoda (according to the taxonomy of the Gastropoda by Bouchet & Rocroi, 2005).

Species
Species within the genus Incerticyclus include:
 Incerticyclus cinereus
 Incerticyclus martinicensis
 Incerticyclus perpallidus
 Incerticyclus prominulus

References

 Nomenclator Zoologicus info

Neocyclotidae
Taxonomy articles created by Polbot